Forbidden Fruit, released in 2000, is an album by Dutch power metal band Elegy.

Track listing
"Icehouse" - 5:11
"Force Majeure" - 4:44
"Killing Time" - 2:52
"Behind the Tears" - 5:23
"The Great Charade" - 4:44
"'Til Eternity" - 7:44
"Masquerade" - 5:01
"Elegant Solution" - 4:28
"I Believe" - 4:50
"Forbidden Fruit" - 7:16

2006 edition bonus tracks
"Sweet Revenge"
"Angel Without Wings"
"The Forgotten"

Japanese Edition Bonus Tracks
"Eloquence"
"Always with You"
"Angel without Wings"
"Spirits"
"The Forgotten"

Personnel

Band members
Ian Parry - vocals, mixing
Patrick Rondat - guitars
Martin Helmantel - bass, backing vocals
Günter Werno - keyboards
Dirk Bruinenberg - drums, backing vocals

Production
Hans Pieters - engineer, mixing
Dennis Leidelmeijer - assistant engineer
Jan Rooymans - mastering

References

External links
 Elegy's Homepage
 Encyclopedia Metallum entry

2000 albums
Elegy (band) albums
Noise Records albums